Giovanni Maria Tucci was an Italian painter. He was a pupil in Siena under il Sodoma. He accompanied his master to Pisa in 1542. He painted chiefly in Siena.

References

16th-century Italian painters
Italian male painters
Painters from Tuscany
Renaissance painters
Year of death unknown
Year of birth unknown
Painters from Siena